On the Wrong Trek is a 1936 short film starring Charley Chase, directed by Harold Law, produced by Hal Roach and distributed by MGM. It features a cameo appearance by Laurel and Hardy.

Plot 
The plot involves Charley recounting the story of his vacation to his co-workers. For his vacation, Charley and his family drive to California....and it ends up everything but a "vacation".

Laurel and Hardy cameo 
At the start of the journey they consider taking on hitchhikers and see Stan and Oliver on the side of the road thumbing a lift (both, however, are thumbing in opposite directions until Hardy notices, slapping Laurel). Oliver is sitting on some luggage and Stan is standing, holding an umbrella. Charley remarks that they look like horse thieves, drives by and scratches the top of his head in the same way that Stan does in all of his films. They appear on screen for 13 seconds.

Cast 
Charley Chase
Rosina Lawrence
Bonita Weber
Clarence Wilson
Stan Laurel
Oliver Hardy

Production 
The film was released on April 18, 1936. It was the last two-reel short made in the Charley Chase series for Hal Roach.
Dave Lord Heath thinks the film is unfairly and inaccurately regarded as an official part of the Laurel and Hardy film series by some. The film has its great moments, including a surprise couple of cameos, but also has a slow segment (Chase singing with a bunch of hobos) which completely brings the film to a crashing halt.

References

External links 
 On The Wrong Trek at the Internet Movie Database

1936 films
1936 comedy films
1936 short films
American black-and-white films
American comedy short films
Films about vacationing
Metro-Goldwyn-Mayer short films
1930s English-language films
1930s American films